Pseudoramibacter is a Gram-positive, strictly anaerobic, non-spore-forming and non-motile bacterial genus from the family of Eubacteriaceae with one known species (Pseudoramibacter alactolyticus). Pseudoramibacter bacteria occur in birds. Pseudoramibacter alactolyticus is associated with endodontic infections.

References

Further reading 
 
 

Eubacteriaceae
Bacteria genera
Monotypic bacteria genera